Andrew Allan (1863–1942) was a British lithographic artist.

Life
Allan was born in Ardrossan, Scotland. Many of his artworks are well known for their fine brush strokes. He went to the Glasgow School of Art in 1882. Allan created the oil painting Widowed, which was displayed at the 1900 Stirling Art Exhibition, and a watercolour at the Glasgow Fine Art Institute. In the same year he sold 2 silver-point drawings, The Music Lesson and Sweet Melody after showing them at the Royal Scottish Academy Exhibition.

Allan died in 1942. His works lost copyright protection in 2013. Several of his paintings are in public collections including Newport in Wales and Dumfries and Galloway.

References

1863 births
1942 deaths
People from Ardrossan
Scottish lithographers
Scottish artists
Alumni of the Glasgow School of Art
20th-century British painters
British male painters
20th-century British printmakers
19th-century British male artists
20th-century British male artists
20th-century lithographers